Zavala may refer to:

Places
Zavala County, Texas
Zavala, Mozambique
Zavala District, a district of Mozambique
Zavala, Bosnia-Herzegovina
Zavala, Bulgaria
Zavala Island, Antarctica
Zavala, Dubrovnik-Neretva County, a village in the Slivno municipality, Croatia

Other uses
Zavala (surname)
Texan schooner Zavala 
Zavala Monastery in Bosnia
Commander Zavala, a major character from the Destiny video game series